John Graham Gow (5 May 1850 – 17 February 1917) was a New Zealand commercial traveler and government trade representative. He was born in Crieff, Perthshire, Scotland on 5 May 1850.

References

1850 births
1917 deaths
People from Crieff
New Zealand public servants
Scottish emigrants to New Zealand